Tomopleura pouloensis is a species of sea snail, a marine gastropod mollusk in the family Borsoniidae.

Description
The size of the shell varies between 8 mm and 17 mm. The small shell is lanceolate and lurid. It contains ten shouldered and carinate whorls, with elevated revolving lines of which there are ten or twelve on the body whorl. The narrow aperture measures one-third the total length of the shell. The outer lip has a profound, wide sinus. The columella is smooth.

Distribution
This marine species occurs off Sri Lanka, the Philippines and Hong Kong

References

 Liu J.Y. [Ruiyu] (ed.). (2008). Checklist of marine biota of China seas. China Science Press. 1267 pp.

External links
 
 Jousseaume F. (1883). Description d'espèces et genres nouveaux de mollusques. Bulletin de la Société Zoologique de France. 8: 186-204, pl. 10.

pouloensis
Gastropods described in 1883